Himesh Choudhary is an Indian television actor and casting director. He has worked in many popular television serials like Yudh on Sony TV, Pukaar on Life OK, Taarak Mehta Ka Ooltah Chashmah on SAB TV, and Crime Patrol on Sony TV. Additionally, he also works as casting director for variety of projects like television promos, ad shoots, television serials etc..
Choudhary also featured in Vividh Bharati's popular radio program Inse Miliye 12 20 to 01 as a guest to tell his success story, which was broadcast on the radio on 13 July 2016.

Actor

TV shows

Film

Casting

Channel Promos

Advertisements

Print campaign

Television Show

Film

References

External links
 

Living people
Indian male television actors
1990 births